Beniamino Cesi (6 November 1845 – 19 January 1907) was a celebrated Italian concert pianist and teaching professor of piano, who taught many of the most distinguished early 20th century pianists of the Neapolitan school, so that his influence spread very widely.

Training 
Born in Naples, Cesi began his studies with his father, and later with Luigi Albanesi. He was heard by Sigismund Thalberg, who was so impressed with him that he made him one of his favourite pupils. He began his career as a concert performer in 1862, and quickly gained a very high reputation in Italy. At the age of 20 he won a competition to gain the position of piano professor at the Royal Conservatorio of San Pietro a Majella in Naples. He was soon considered a front rank performer in cities throughout Europe, including London, where he appeared in 1886. Although he was considered a great interpreter of J. S. Bach, Beethoven, Schumann and Chopin, he was also a champion of old Italian music.

When Anton Rubinstein was appointed director of the Petrograd Conservatory, he invited Cesi to direct the pianoforte schools there. Cesi accepted the appointment in 1885, remaining until 1891, when he was forced to return to Italy owing to a paralysis which had set in. This, however, left his intellect unimpaired and still gave him the use of his right hand, and in 1894 he became a teacher in the Conservatory at Palermo, and after a few years there he was able to return to Naples Conservatory, where he remained in charge of a chamber-music class until his death in 1907. His educational writings (Method for Pianoforte) had considerable importance, and he wrote many volumes of revision of piano music.

Among his notable pupils were Giuseppe Martucci, Alessandro Longo, Michele Esposito, Samuel Maykapar, Emanuel de Beaupuis, Edgardo del Valle De Paz and Leopoldo Mugnone.

Cesi belonged to a very musical family. His two sons Napoleone Cesi (born 1867) and Sigismondo Cesi (b. 1869) carried on his artistic heritage. Both were pianist-composers. Napoleone published important piano compositions and won a number of prizes with them. Sigismondo co-founded the Liceo Musicale, a private music school, in Naples in 1908 with Ernesto Marciano, gave concerts in many parts of Italy, and became a well-known teacher.

Cecilia Cesi (b. Palermo 1903) was the daughter of Napoleone, and became a pianist, making a debut at age 6 and giving a successful concert in Naples at age 8. She also performed successfully in Rome, Milan and elsewhere in Italy.

Writings 
Metodo per pianoforte, in three large sections, to be studied simultaneously.
1. Exercises and Studies
2. Polyphonic works: Fugues, canons, legato style.
3. Pieces: Sonatas, trios, quartets, concerti, etc. (Ricordi)

(Sigismondo Cesi): Appunti di Storia e di Letteratura del pianoforte.
(Sigismondo Cesi, with E. Marciano): Prontuario di Musica (Ricordi).

Sources 
 Pier Paolo De Martino, Beniamino Cesi da Napoli a San Pietroburgo, in Napoli Nobilissima, IX, 2008, pp. 131–144.

References 

1845 births
1907 deaths
Musicians from Naples
Italian male pianists
19th-century Italian musicians
19th-century pianists
19th-century Italian male musicians